Spencer Oliver may refer to:

 Spencer Oliver (boxer) (born 1975), English boxer
 R. Spencer Oliver (born 1938), American government staffer and diplomat

See also
 Spencer Oliver Fisher (1843–1919), American politician